Hope is a city in Steele County, North Dakota, United States. The population was 272 at the 2020 census. Hope was founded in 1881.

Geography

Hope is located at  (47.322761, -97.720760).

Demographics

2010 census
As of the census of 2010, there were 258 people, 131 households, and 75 families residing in the city. The racial makeup of the city was 100.0% White.

There were 131 households, of which 14.5% had children under the age of 18 living with them, 51.9% were married couples living together, 2.3% had a female householder with no husband present, 3.1% had a male householder with no wife present, and 42.7% were non-families. 39.7% of all households were made up of individuals, and 22.9% had someone living alone who was 65 years of age or older. The average household size was 1.97 and the average family size was 2.63.

The median age in the city was 52 years. 15.1% of residents were under the age of 18; 4.9% were between the ages of 18 and 24; 17.1% were from 25 to 44; 30.2% were from 45 to 64; and 32.6% were 65 years of age or older. The gender makeup of the city was 47.7% male and 52.3% female.

2000 census
As of the census of 2000, there were 303 people, 131 households, and 75 families residing in the city. The population density was 491.0 people per square mile (188.7/km2). There were 155 housing units at an average density of 251.1 per square mile (96.5/km2). The racial makeup of the city was 98.68% White, 0.33% African American, 0.33% Asian, 0.66% from other races. Hispanic or Latino of any race were 0.66% of the population.

There were 131 households, out of which 26.7% had children under the age of 18 living with them, 49.6% were married couples living together, 6.9% had a female householder with no husband present, and 42.0% were non-families. 37.4% of all households were made up of individuals, and 18.3% had someone living alone who was 65 years of age or older. The average household size was 2.31 and the average family size was 3.14.

In the city, the population was spread out, with 29.7% under the age of 18, 4.3% from 18 to 24, 26.1% from 25 to 44, 16.2% from 45 to 64, and 23.8% who were 65 years of age or older. The median age was 41 years. For every 100 females, there were 94.2 males. For every 100 females age 18 and over, there were 97.2 males.

The median income for a household in the city was $31,042, and the median income for a family was $44,167. Males had a median income of $29,625 versus $21,875 for females. The per capita income for the city was $16,724. None of the families and 2.0% of the population were living below the poverty line.

Education

Hope is part of the Hope-Page School District. Students attend elementary school (K-6) in Page while students attend middle school through high school (7-12) in Hope. The school mascot is the Spartans, recently changed from the Wolverines due to a recent cooperation of sports programs between Hope-Page High School and Finley-Sharon High School. Oddly enough, the mascots for Michigan State University and the University of Michigan are the Spartans and Wolverines, respectively.

Climate
This climatic region is typified by large seasonal temperature differences, with warm to hot (and often humid) summers and cold (sometimes severely cold) winters.  According to the Köppen Climate Classification system, Hope has a humid continental climate, abbreviated "Dfb" on climate maps.

References

External links
 Hope-Page High School website
 Hope of the prairie : 75th anniversary, 1882-1957 from the Digital Horizons website

Cities in North Dakota
Cities in Steele County, North Dakota
Populated places established in 1881
1881 establishments in Dakota Territory